Denis Boyles is a journalist, editor, university lecturer and the author/editor of several books of poetry, travel/history, criticism, humor, practical advice and essays, including Design Poetics (1975), The Modern Man's Guide to Life (1986), African Lives (1989), Man Eaters Motel (1991), A Man's Life: The Complete Instructions (1996), The Pocket Professor series (2001) and Vile France (2005), a satirical examination of French elites. His work has appeared in many American and European magazines and newspapers. As an editor, he launched an "underground" newspaper in Baltimore in the '60s then served on the editorial staff of Crawdaddy, The New York Times Magazine, National Lampoon, Playboy,  and Men's Health, where he was a popular columnist. He served as editorial director for several digital publishers, including Novo Media and Third Age Media, and from 2010 to 2013 was a juror for the University of Missouri Journalism School-administered City and Regional Magazine Association competition. For several years he wrote commentary on the European press in a column for National Review Online, and was a contributor to the 2009 Oxford Encyclopedia of Human Rights. In 2008, he wrote Superior, Nebraska, a book about Midwestern political and social values (Doubleday) and in 2009, he co-wrote a documentary film, Femmes de Soldats, with French journalist Alain Hertoghe for Kuiv Productions Paris.  Boyles recently completed a history of the creation and compilation of the Encyclopædia Britannica's 11th edition (1910) for Knopf. He resides in France, where he taught at The Brouzils Seminars, a graduate and undergraduate writing and creative arts program. In 2009, with philosopher Anthony O'Hear OBE, he launched The Fortnightly Review's "New Series", of which he is currently co-editor (with Prof. Alan Macfarlane), and editor of its book imprint, Odd Volumes. From 2012-2015, he was a visiting fellow in the School of Humanities at the University of Buckingham. In 2015, he joined the faculties of the Chavagnes Studium, where he teaches literature courses and tutors senior students in literature and philosophy, and l’Institut Catholique d’Études Supérieures in La Roche sur Yon (I.C.E.S., the University of the Vendée), where he teaches graduate courses in journalism. His MA was awarded by the graduate  Writing Seminars at the Johns Hopkins University; his doctorate is from the Communications and Media Research Institute (CAMRI) of the University of Westminster in London.

Bibliography 
 Design Poetics (1975)
 The Modern Man's Guide to Life (1986)
 African Lives (1989)
 Man Eaters Motel and Other Stops on the Railway to Nowhere (1991)
 The Modern Man's Guide to Modern Women (1993)
 A Man's Life: The Complete Instructions (1996)
 The Lost Lore of a Man's Life (1997)
 The Pocket Professor'''s guides (religion, physics, philosophy, economics) (as series editor) (2001)
 Vile France (2005)
 Superior, Nebraska: The Common-Sense Values of America's Heartland (2008); Revised and republished as The Republican River: Democracy in Middle America (2018) 
 Everything Explained That Is Explainable: On the Creation of the Encyclopædia Britannica's Celebrated Eleventh Edition'' (2016),

External links 
 National Review archive
 Denis Boyles
 The Brouzils Seminars
 University of Buckingham
 I.C.E.S.
 CAMRI
 University of Westminster
 The Fortnightly Review
 Femmes de Soldats production notes
 

Year of birth missing (living people)
Living people
American essayists
American motivational writers
American travel writers
Johns Hopkins University alumni
American magazine journalists
American male essayists